Tassadit Aïssou (born June 19, 1989, in Sidi Aïch, Béjaïa) is an Algerian volleyball player and Olympian representing Algeria. She is a middle-blocker. She attended Chouhada Chikhoune High School in Béjaïa.

Aïssou represented Algeria in the Women's African Volleyball Championships in 2007, 2009, 2011, and 2013; the 2009 Mediterranean Games; the 2008 and 2012 Summer Olympics; the 2010 FIVB World Championships; the 2011 All-Africa Games; the 2011 FIVB World Cup; the 2011 Pan Arab Games; the 2012 African Clubs Championship; and the 2013 and 2014 FIVB Volleyball World Grand Prix.

Club information

Current club :  NR Chlef
Current club :  ASW Bejaia
Debut club :  Seddouk Volleyball Bejaia

References

1989 births
Living people
Algerian women's volleyball players
Volleyball players at the 2008 Summer Olympics
Volleyball players at the 2012 Summer Olympics
Olympic volleyball players of Algeria
Competitors at the 2009 Mediterranean Games
People from Sidi-Aïch
Middle blockers
Mediterranean Games competitors for Algeria
21st-century Algerian people